This is a list of rugby league footballers who have represented for the Great Britain national rugby league team.

Players

Non-Test playing tourists
The following is an incomplete list of players who have played for Great Britain in non-Test matches, usually on tours to Australasia, e.g. Australia, and New Zealand, against club, county, region, or state teams.

Chick Jenkins
Harry Archer
Jack Bartholomew
John Bates (Dewsbury)
David Bradbury
Gary Cooper
Geoff Crewdson (Keighley)
Gwyn Davies
Ivor Davies
Oliver Dolan
Carl Dooler
Joe Doyle
Harold Ellerington
Mick Exley
Fred Farrar
Norman Fender
Alfred Francis
Joseph Walter Guerin (Hunslet F.C.)
Ben Halfpenny
Fred Harris
Tom Helm
John Henderson
Fred Hughes
Harold Jones
Sammy Lloyd
David Lyon
Thomas Martyn
Danny Naughton
Ken Noble (Huddersfield)
Jack O'Garra (Widnes)
Frank Osmond
Gilbert Robinson
Ian Smales
John Smales
John Taylor
Stan Whitty
Ian Wilkinson
Leslie Williams

See also

List of England national rugby league team players
List of Ireland national rugby league team players
List of Scotland national rugby league team players
List of Wales national rugby league team players

Notes

References
 
 
 

 Great Britain
 
Great Britain